Ouadane is a department of the Adrar Region in Mauritania. This mostly desert-area department
is made up of the single Ouadane town.

References

Departments of Mauritania
Adrar Region